Environmental regeneration may refer to:
Environmental remediation (through active intervention)
autonomous regeneration (ecology)